Santos Trail System is a network of hiking, equestrian and mountain bike trails outside of Ocala, Florida. The trails are maintained by the Ocala Mountain Biking Association (OMBA). The trail system is designated at the Bronze Level by International Mountain Bicycling Association (IMBA Ride Center).

The trail system is on land that is part of the Cross Florida Greenway. Volunteers began trail development on the property in 1993. There are more than 85 miles (136.79 km) of trails with widely varying difficulty in the system. In March the OMBA hosts a Spring Break Fat Tire Festival that includes three days and two nights of music, food, riding and socializing. Other events include The Take a Kid Mountain Biking Day.

Mountain bike trails include:
 Ant HIll 
 Bunny 
 Canopy 
 Cowbone 
 Dogbone 
 Dr. Ruth 
 Ern n' Burn 
 John Brown 
 Nayls Trail 
 Rattle Snake 
 Sinkhole 
 Speedway 
 Twister 
 Vortex Red

References

Hiking trails in Florida
Marion County, Florida